The Affairs of Anatol is a 1921 American silent comedy-drama film directed by Cecil B. DeMille, starring Wallace Reid and Gloria Swanson. The film is based on the 1893 play Anatol by Arthur Schnitzler.

Plot
Socialite Anatol Spencer (Reid), finding his relationship with his wife Vivian (Swanson) lackluster, goes in search of excitement.

After bumping into old flame Emilie Dixon (Hawley) at a nightclub, Anatol promises to "rescue" her from her soulless city lifestyle, which lecherous theatrical backer Gordon Bronson (Roberts) has enabled. Anatol convinces Emilie to discard the jewelry that Bronson has given her, but refuses to give up his wife in turn (for Emilie has fallen in love with him). Emilie invites Bronson and others to a party at the apartment. When Anatol finds out, he trashes the room and leaves Emilie to her fate: marriage to Bronson. With the affair over, Anatol tells Vivian to promise to stop him the next time he attempts to "rescue" a woman.

Some time later, Anatol and Vivian throw a party, with Hindu hypnotist Nazzer Singh (Kosloff) acting as entertainment. Singh hypnotizes Vivian into believing that she is wading through a stream, and she begins undressing. Disgusted with the hypocrisies of high society (which has shown itself to not be much better than Emilie and Bronson's world), Anatol decides to move with his wife to the countryside.

Meanwhile, farmer Abner Elliott (Monte Blue) discovers that his wife Annie (Ayres) has purchased a dress using money stolen from his lockbox of church funds. He rebuffs her and sends her away, resolving to take the blame for the theft. Repenting, Annie throws herself off of a bridge into a river just as Anatol and Vivian are rowing past in a boat. The two quickly bring her to shore and, after realizing that they cannot wake her up, Vivian takes their car to find a local doctor. Anatol finds that Annie is awake and she manipulates him into letting her take his wallet. When Vivian returns with the doctor (Ogle), Annie is kissing Anatol, not knowing that he is married. As Annie leaves to make amends with her husband (lying about how she obtained the money), Anatol, now disillusioned with the country life as well, asks the doctor where he can find "honesty and loyalty". The doctor responds that those qualities, like charity, "start at home".

Anatol and Vivian return to the city, where Vivian plans to leave her husband for his perceived infidelity. The two separately go out to enjoy the nightlife and forgot their troubles. Anatol meets Satan Synne (Daniels), an infamously devilish performer. He offers to go home with her, but she only accepts after receiving a telephone call from a Dr. Johnston (Hall). At Synne's apartment, she offers Anatol a drink that impairs judgment and asks him for three thousand dollars. After she faints upon receiving another call from Dr. Johnston, it is revealed that Synne's immoral lifestyle is only a means to gather money to pay for expensive surgeries for her husband, a dying World War I veteran. Anatol gives her the three thousand dollars and leaves as she falls to her knees in prayer.

Anatol returns home, finding that Vivian is still out on the town. She eventually returns with his best friend Max Runyon (Dexter), whom she has been spending more time with while her husband is busy. When Max is evasive about whether she has been unfaithful, Anatol convinces Singh (who is leaving the United States) to hypnotize Vivian into truthfully answering the question of whether she has been. Ultimately, Anatol decides that he trusts his wife too much to accuse her of cheating and breaks the trance. The two happily embrace and kiss.

Cast
 Wallace Reid as Anatol DeWitt Spencer
 Gloria Swanson as Vivian Spencer
 Wanda Hawley as Emilie Dixon
 Theodore Roberts as Gordon Bronson
 Elliott Dexter as Max Runyon
 Theodore Kosloff as Mr. Nazzer Singh
 Agnes Ayres as Annie Elliott
 Monte Blue as Abner Elliott
 Bebe Daniels as Satan Synne

Uncredited
 Alma Bennett as Chorus Girl
 William Boyd as Guest
 Shannon Day as Chorus Girl
 Julia Faye as Tibra
 Elinor Glyn as Bridge Player
 Winter Hall as Dr. Johnston
 Raymond Hatton as Great Blatsky (Violin Teacher)
 Fred Huntley as Stage Manager
 Lucien Littlefield as Spencer's Valet
 Zelma Maja as Nurse
 Ruth Miller as Marie, the Spencers' Maid
 Polly Moran as Orchestra Leader
 Charles Stanton Ogle as Dr. Bowles
 Guy Oliver as the Spencers' Butler

Background
The screenplay was based on a one-act play called Anatol written by Arthur Schnitzler in 1893 and translated into English by Harley Granville-Barker. The play opened in New York City on October 14, 1912, with John Barrymore in the title role, and ran for 72 performances.

Preservation status
A print of the film still exists.  Film Preservation Associates copyrighted a version of the film in 1999 with a musical score composed and performed by Brian Benison. The film was later produced for VHS by David Shepard of FPA with a runtime of 117 minutes, and subsequently issued as a DVD.

Sam Wood apparently created Don't Tell Everything (1921), also starring Swanson, Reid, and Dexter, in part using outtakes left over from The Affairs of Anatol.

See also
 Wallace Reid filmography

References

External links

 
 The AFI Catalog of Feature Films:The Affairs of Anatol
 
 The Affairs of Anatol, the full movie, available for free download at Internet Archive
 Stills at cecilbdemille.com

1921 films
1921 comedy-drama films
American silent feature films
American black-and-white films
American films based on plays
Famous Players-Lasky films
Films based on works by Arthur Schnitzler
Films directed by Cecil B. DeMille
Paramount Pictures films
Surviving American silent films
Articles containing video clips
1920s American films
Silent American comedy-drama films
1920s English-language films